The Men's individual pursuit competition at the 2017 World Championships was held on 14 April 2017.

Results

Qualifying
The first two racers will race for gold, the third and fourth fastest rider will race for the bronze medal.

Finals
The finals were started at 20:41.

References

Men's individual pursuit
UCI Track Cycling World Championships – Men's individual pursuit